The 30th Los Angeles Film Critics Association Awards, announced on 11 December 2004 by the Los Angeles Film Critics Association, honored the best in film for 2004.

Winners

Best Picture:
Sideways
Runner-up: Million Dollar Baby
Best Director:
Alexander Payne – Sideways
Runner-up: Martin Scorsese – The Aviator
Best Actor:
Liam Neeson – Kinsey
Runner-up: Paul Giamatti – Sideways
Best Actress:
Imelda Staunton – Vera Drake
Runner-up: Julie Delpy – Before Sunset
Best Supporting Actor:
Thomas Haden Church – Sideways
Runner-up: Morgan Freeman – Million Dollar Baby
Best Supporting Actress:
Virginia Madsen – Sideways
Runner-up: Cate Blanchett – The Aviator and Coffee and Cigarettes
Best Screenplay:
Alexander Payne and Jim Taylor – Sideways
Runner-up: Charlie Kaufman – Eternal Sunshine of the Spotless Mind
Best Cinematography:
Dion Beebe and Paul Cameron – Collateral
Runner-up: Xiaoding Zhao – House of Flying Daggers (Shi mian mai fu)
Best Production Design:
Dante Ferretti – The Aviator
Runner-up: Huo Tingxiao – House of Flying Daggers (Shi mian mai fu)
Best Music Score:
Michael Giacchino – The Incredibles
Runner-up: Alexandre Desplat – Birth
Best Foreign-Language Film:
House of Flying Daggers (Shi mian mai fu) • China/Hong Kong
Runner-up: The Motorcycle Diaries (Diarios de motocicleta) • Argentina
Best Documentary/Non-Fiction Film:
Born into Brothels
Runner-up: Fahrenheit 9/11
Best Animation:
The Incredibles
The Douglas Edwards Experimental/Independent Film/Video Award:
Ken Jacobs – Star Spangled to Death
New Generation Award:
Joshua Marston (director) and Catalina Sandino Moreno (actress) – Maria Full of Grace
Career Achievement Award:
Jerry Lewis
Special Citation:
Richard Schickel and Brian Jamieson of Warner Bros. for the reconstruction of Samuel Fuller's The Big Red One.

References

External links
 30th Annual Los Angeles Film Critics Association Awards

2004
Los Angeles Film Critics Association Awards
Los Angeles Film Critics Association Awards
Los Angeles Film Critics Association Awards
Los Angeles Film Critics Association Awards